William R. Thompkins (April 21, 1925 – September 18, 1971) was an American actor and stuntman known for playing Toothless in the TV series Rawhide between 1960 and 1964, and Baxter Gang Member in A Fistful of Dollars (1964). He was killed on September 18, 1971, in a road accident.

Filmography

References

External links

 
 

1925 births
1971 deaths
American stunt performers
20th-century American male actors
Male actors from Tacoma, Washington
Male Spaghetti Western actors